Ivor Ronald John Brown (1 April 1888, in Shardlow – 1966) was a professional footballer who played for Tottenham Hotspur, Coventry City, Reading and Swansea Town.

Football career 
Brown began his football career at Ripley Town. The centre forward joined Tottenham Hotspur where he made 12 appearances between 1909–11. After leaving the Spurs he had spells at Coventry City, Reading, first paid transfer to Swansea Town before ending his career at Porth Athletic.

References 

1888 births
1966 deaths
People from Shardlow
Footballers from Derbyshire
English footballers
English Football League players
Tottenham Hotspur F.C. players
Coventry City F.C. players
Reading F.C. players
Swansea City A.F.C. players
Ripley Town F.C. players
Date of death missing
Association football forwards